Marinoni: The Fire in the Frame is a Canadian documentary film, directed by Tony Girardin and released in 2014. The film profiles Giuseppe Marinoni, a former competitive cyclist turned bicycle manufacturer who at age 75 is attempting to set a new cycling time record for his age bracket. As a secondary storyline, the film also focuses on Marinoni's longtime friendship with champion cyclist Jocelyn Lovell, who raced on a Marinoni bike until his career ended when a traffic accident left him quadriplegic.

The film premiered at the Hot Docs Canadian International Film Festival in 2014.

The film received two Canadian Screen Award nominations, for Best Feature Length Documentary and Best Editing in a Documentary, at the 3rd Canadian Screen Awards in 2015.

References

External links
 

2014 films
2014 documentary films
Canadian sports documentary films
2010s English-language films
2010s Canadian films